Should I Do It is the twelfth studio album by American country music artist Tanya Tucker, released on June 29, 1981 by MCA Records. Two singles from the album, "Should I Do It," and "Rodeo Girls" peaked at 50 and 81 respectively on the Billboard Country Singles chart. The album overall peaked at #48 on the Top Country Albums chart.

Track listing
"Should I Do It" (Layng Martine Jr.)
"Stormy Weather" [with Emmylou Harris] (Tom Snow, Leo Sayer)
"Halfway to Heaven" (Jerry Goldstein, Robert E. Getter, Guy F. Peritore)
"Heartache #3" (Joe Rainey)
"You Don't Have to Say You Love Me" (Pino Donaggio, Simon Napier-Bell, Vicki Wickham)
"Rodeo Girls" (Joe Rainey, Tanya Tucker)
"I Oughta Let Go" (Troy Seals, Eddie Setser, Steve Diamond)
"Lucky Enough for Two" (Henry Gaffney)
"We're Playing Games Again" (Troy Seals, Richard Kerr)
"Shoulder to Shoulder" [with Glen Campbell] (Henry Gaffney)

Personnel
Tanya Tucker - lead vocals
Rick Shlosser, Steve Turner - drums, percussion
Bill McCubbin, Leland Sklar - bass guitar
Larry Muhoberac, Jai Winding - piano
Bill Cuomo - synthesizer
Buzz Feiten, Jay Dee Maness, Dean Parks, Lee Ritenour, Jerry Swallow, Fred Tackett - guitar
Jerry Swallow - mandolin
Chuck Findley, Jerry Hey, Jim Horn, Andrew Love, James Mitchell - horns
Nick DeCaro - accordion
John Bahler, Debbie Hall, Emmylou Harris, Ron Hicklin, Sandie Hill, Gene Morford, Herb Pedersen, Jerry Whitman - additional vocals

Chart performance

References

1981 albums
Tanya Tucker albums
MCA Records albums
Albums produced by Gary Klein (producer)